Francis Joseph Mace  (1837 – 7 August 1927) was a Taranaki settler whose exploits during the Taranaki Wars earned him much praise. Chief among his awards was the New Zealand Cross, the highest colonial gallantry award available in New Zealand.

Military career
Mace's military career began in the Taranaki Rifle Volunteers. At the Battle of Waireka on 28 March 1860 Mace's service as a dispatch rider drew a lot of attention. In July 1862 he was given a presentation revolver for his services during the battle.  His bravery in numerous other engagements was widely acknowledged.

New Zealand Cross
Mace was presented with a New Zealand Cross on 23 January 1877. He eventually gifted his cross to New Plymouth Museum (now Puke Ariki) in 1927.

Civilian life
After the war Mace took an active part in the community. He married, raised a family and farmed in the Omata district and served on Taranaki's provincial council and then Oakura Roads Board among other positions. Mace died at Oakura on 7 August 1927, aged 90, and was lauded in a glowing obituary, which noted he was "a brave and gallant officer and gentleman."

Legacy
More recently, Mace's contribution was cast in a different context in Puke Ariki’s ‘Taranaki War 1860–2010 – Our Legacy Our Challenge – Te Ahi Ka Roa, Te Ahi Katoro’. A panel in the 2010 exhibition observed that ‘by admiring and glorifying his actions, settlers and their descendants could celebrate their victories over Māori, and see them as right and good’.

References

Wellington Independent,National Library of New Zealand
Cyclopedia of New Zealand (Taranaki, Hawke's Bay and Wellington Provincial Districts)
 New Zealand Electronic Text Centre
Mace's New Zealand Cross at Puke Ariki, New Plymouth, New Zealand.
Gudgeon, T. W.The Defenders of New Zealand (1887)
Daily News 8 August 1927, p. 9.

External links
 Portrait of Mace wearing his New Zealand Cross, Puke Ariki, New Plymouth, New Zealand.
 Mace's New Zealand Cross, Puke Ariki, New Plymouth, New Zealand.

1837 births
1927 deaths
People of the New Zealand Wars
Taranaki wars
Recipients of the New Zealand Cross (1869)
People from Madeira